In abstract algebra, a branch of mathematics, a maximal semilattice quotient is a commutative monoid derived from another commutative monoid by making certain elements equivalent to each other.

Every commutative monoid can be endowed with its algebraic preordering ≤ . By definition, x≤ y holds, if there exists z such that x+z=y. The binary relation  is a monoid congruence of M, and the quotient monoid  is the maximal semilattice quotient of M.

This terminology can be explained by the fact that the canonical projection p from M onto  is universal among all monoid homomorphisms from M to a (∨,0)-semilattice, that is, for any (∨,0)-semilattice S and any monoid homomorphism f: M→ S, there exists a unique (∨,0)-homomorphism  such that f=gp.

If M is a refinement monoid, then  is a distributive semilattice.

References

A.H. Clifford and G.B. Preston, The Algebraic Theory of Semigroups. Vol. I. Mathematical Surveys, No. 7, American Mathematical Society, Providence, R.I. 1961. xv+224 p.

Lattice theory